Sugar Money, the third novel by British author Jane Harris, was first published by Faber and Faber in 2017 and shortlisted for several literary prizes including the Walter Scott Prize. The novel was also published in the USA by Arcade/Skyhorse, in Australia and New Zealand by Allen and Unwin and in Italy by Neri Pozza.

Plot introduction
Martinique, 1765, and brothers Emile and Lucien are charged by their French master, Father Cleophas, with a mission. They must return to Grenada, the island they once called home, and smuggle back the 42 slaves claimed by English invaders at the hospital plantation in Fort Royal. While Lucien, barely in his teens, sees the trip as a great adventure, the older and worldlier Emile has no illusions about the dangers they will face. But with no choice other than to obey Cleophas - and sensing the possibility, however remote, of finding his first love Celeste - he sets out with his brother on this ‘reckless venture’.

Reception
Sugar Money was published in October 2017 to critical acclaim with widespread positive reviews online and in many publications including The Times, The Sunday Times, The Independent, The Express, The Irish Times, The Glasgow Herald, The Spectator and The Daily Mail.

 Sunday Express said "Pitches you headfirst into this outstanding, heartbreaking story of siblings, slavery and the savagery of the colonial past."
Siobhan Murphy of The Times said "Harris builds a lush sense of place, and the pace and tension of a rip-roaring adventure here, with derring-do and double-crossing."
 The Irish Times said "Through masterful detail, Harris shows the dehumanisation of the brothers and their fellow slaves . . . Beautifully cadenced."

Shortlistings 
The Walter Scott Prize (2018) 
The Wilbur Smith Prize for Adventure Writing 2018 
The Historical Writers Association Gold Crown Prize 2018

Publication 
It was published in the UK by Faber and Faber, in the US by Viking Press, and in Australia/New Zealand by Allen & Unwin. It has been published in the Netherlands, Italy, Denmark, Greece, Spain, Germany, Norway, Poland, France, Portugal, Sweden and Brazil. It is due to be published in Israel, Serbia and Montenegro, Romania, Croatia, Russia, Turkey.. An audiobook version is available, narrated by the author. There is also a Danish audiobook version.

References

External links
 
 Interview on the BBC's Cover to Cover (October 2017)
 Interview for Arena RTE (October 2017)
 https://www.bbc.co.uk/programmes/b097s8tg Interview on The Janet Forsyth Show] (BBC Radio 4  starting 1hr 38min in, 2017)
 Interview for The Herald Glasgow

2018 British novels
Faber and Faber books
Fiction set in 1765
Novels set in Martinique
Grenada in fiction
Novels set in the 1760s
Viking Press books